Viva Valdez is an American sitcom starring Carmen Zapata and Rodolfo Hoyos that aired on ABC from May 31 to September 6, 1976.

Cast

 Rodolfo Hoyos Jr.Luis Valdez
 Carmen Zapata...Sophia Valdez
 James Victor...Victor Valdez
 Nelson D. Cuevas...Ernesto Valdez
 Lisa Mordente...Connie Valdez
 Claudio Martinez...Pepe Valdez
 Jorge Cervera, Jr.Jerry Ramirez
 Maria O'Brien...Inez

Synopsis

The Valdezes are a closeknit Mexican-American family living in East Los Angeles, California. The parents, Luis and Sophia, try to maintain traditional values, while their four children – Victor, Ernesto, Connie, and Pepe – are more attuned to the latest trends in mid-1970s American life. Luis runs a plumbing business with Victor, Ernesto is an artistic young man who is in training to work for the telephone company, Connie is an irrepressible teenager, and Pepe is a 12-year-old baseball fanatic. Jerry Ramirez is a cousin who has recently arrived in the United States and has trouble with the English language. Inez is Connies friend.

Production

Bernard Rothman, Stan Jacobson, and Jack Wohl created Viva Valdez and were its executive producers. Alan Rafkin directed all twelve episodes. Earl Barret wrote for the show.

Broadcast history

Viva Valdez premiered on May 31, 1976, as a summer replacement series and aired on Monday nights at 8:00 p.m. through July 5, 1976. After a four-week hiatus, it returned to the air in the same time slot on August 2, 1976. Its twelfth and final episode aired on September 6, 1976.

Episodes

Sources

References

External links
Viva Valdez opening credits on YouTube
ABC TV promo for premiere episode of Viva Valdez on YouTube

American Broadcasting Company original programming
1976 American television series debuts
1976 American television series endings
1970s American sitcoms
English-language television shows
Latino sitcoms
Television series about families
Television shows set in Los Angeles